Merle Grace Kearns (May 19, 1938 – August 9, 2014) was a member of the Ohio House of Representatives representing the 72nd House district and serving as Majority Leader in the 126th General Assembly. Prior to her stint in the Ohio House, Kearns was a member of the Ohio Senate from 1991 to 2000, representing the 10th Senate District. Born in Bellefonte, Pennsylvania, Kearns received her bachelor's degree in home economics from Ohio State University. Kearns also served as Clark County, Ohio commissioner and lived in Springfield, Ohio. She died in Columbus, Ohio.

References

External links
Profile on the Ohio Ladies Gallery website

Republican Party members of the Ohio House of Representatives
2014 deaths
Republican Party Ohio state senators
County commissioners in Ohio
Women state legislators in Ohio
1938 births
People from Bellefonte, Pennsylvania
Politicians from Springfield, Ohio
Ohio State University alumni
21st-century American politicians
21st-century American women politicians